Sverre Rynning-Tønnesen (24 April 1894 – 1970) was a Norwegian electrical engineer and civil servant.

He graduated from the Norwegian Institute of Technology in 1922, and began working in Kristiania in the same year. From 1945 to 1962 he served as director of Telegrafverket, which would change its name to Televerket in 1969 and Telenor in 1995. He had been named director already in 1942, but he was exiled in London until 1945 due to the German occupation of Norway.

He was an uncle of police leader Carl M. Rynning-Tønnesen.

References

1894 births
1970 deaths
Norwegian electrical engineers
Directors of government agencies of Norway
Norwegian Institute of Technology alumni
Norwegian people of World War II
Norwegian expatriates in the United Kingdom